The California scrub jay (Aphelocoma californica) is a species of scrub jay native to western North America. It ranges from southern British Columbia throughout California and western Nevada near Reno to west of the Sierra Nevada.  The California scrub jay was once lumped with Woodhouse's scrub jay and collectively called the western scrub jay. The group was also lumped with the island scrub jay and the Florida scrub jay; the taxon was then called simply scrub jay. The California scrub jay is nonmigratory and can be found in urban areas, where it can become tame and will come to bird feeders. While many refer to scrub jays as "blue jays", the blue jay is a different species of bird entirely.

Etymology
The generic name, Aphelocoma, derives from Latinized Ancient Greek apheles- (from ἀφελής-) "simple" + Latin coma (from Greek kome κόμη) "hair", in reference to the lack of striped or banded feathers in this genus, compared to other jays. The species name, californica, is Latin for "from California".

Description
In general, this species has a blue head, wings, and tail; a gray-brown back; grayish underparts; and white eyebrows. The throat is whitish with a blue necklace. The call or "screech" is described as "harsh and scratchy".

Behavior

Habitat 

True to its name, the California scrub jay inhabits areas of low scrub, preferring pinon-juniper forests, oak woods, and edges of mixed evergreen forests. It also inhabits suburban gardens.

Foraging
California scrub jays usually forage in pairs, family groups, or small non-kin groups, outside of the breeding season. They feed on small animals, such as frogs and lizards, eggs and young of other birds, insects, and (particularly in winter) grains, nuts, and berries. They will also eat fruit and vegetables growing in backyards.

Food storing
California scrub jays, like many other corvids, exploit ephemeral surpluses by storing food in scattered caches within their territories. They rely on highly accurate and complex memories to recover the hidden caches, often after long periods of time. In the process of collecting and storing this food, they have shown an ability to plan ahead in choosing cache sites to provide adequate food volume and variety for the future. Western scrub jays are also able to rely on their accurate observational spatial memories to steal food from caches made by conspecifics. Food-storing birds implement a number of strategies to protect their caches from potential 'pilferers.' 

Anecdotally, scrub jays – and corvids more generally – are known for an attraction to, and thievery of, brightly colored objects. Recent research debunks, or at least casts doubt, on this idea. Corvids do, however, have a mischievous streak, and scrub jays are not above outright theft. They have been observed stealing acorns from acorn woodpecker caches. Some scrub jays snatch acorns from the hiding places of other jays. When these birds go to hide their own acorns, they check first that no other jays are watching. Other protection methods include moving the cache in the presence of an observer, storing inedible decoys like small stones instead of food, and hiding the cache once a scavenging bird is no longer watching; these behaviors are thought to vary based on the presence or absence of potential pilferers (like other corvids) as well as what kind of animal might pilfer the cache, implying strategic and socially complex motives behind different kinds of caching behavior.

Intelligence

Recent research has suggested that western scrub jays, along with several other corvids, are among the most intelligent of animals. The brain-to-body mass ratio of adult scrub jays rivals that of chimpanzees and cetaceans, and is dwarfed only by that of humans. Scrub jays are also the only non-primate or non-dolphin shown to plan ahead for the future (known as metacognition), which was previously thought of as a uniquely human trait. Other studies have shown that they can remember locations of over 200 food caches, as well as the food item in each cache and its rate of decay. To protect their caches from pilfering conspecifics, scrub jays will choose locations out of sight of their competitors, or re-cache caches once they are alone, suggesting that they can take into account the perspective of others.
 
Jays are able to mimic raptors like red-tailed and red-shouldered hawks with such accuracy that is can be difficult to distinguish between species using calls alone; possible explanations for this behavior include warning other jays about the presence of a predator or trying to deter birds (like cache-pilfering corvids) from a given area. However, jays have been observed employing raptor-mimicking calls without the presence of other birds, making the precise adaptive reason for this behavior unknown, though it may be two-fold. California scrub jays also summon others to screech over the body of a dead jay, according to research from the University of California, Davis. The birds' cacophonous "funerals" can last for up to half an hour.

Nesting

The chicks start off fully gray. The older they get, the more they turn blue. On their heads, chicks tend to have a red crest that resembles a comb. The chick will lose its crest at day seven, just like the way the baby chickens lose their egg tooth at 5–7 days. Four to six eggs are laid from March through July, with some regional variations. There are two common shell color variations: pale green with irregular, olive-colored spots or markings; and pale grayish-white to green with reddish-brown spots. The female incubates the eggs for about 16 days. The young leave the nest about 18 days after hatching.

Life span 
The life span of wild California scrub jays is approximately 9 years. The oldest known western scrub jay was found in Castaic, CA, in 1991 and raised in captivity. "Aaron" lived to be 19 years, and 8 months old.

Diseases 
Populations are being adversely affected by the West Nile virus, particularly in California's Central Valley.

Phylogeny

Woodhouse's, California, Island, and Florida scrub jay were once considered subspecies of a single "scrub jay" species. They are now believed to be distinct. Beyond the close relationship of the "California" and island scrub jays, resolution of their evolutionary history has proven very difficult.

Woodhouse's scrub jay  differ in plumage (paler blue above, with an indistinct and usually incomplete breast band) from California scrub jay which is darker blue above with a strongly defined – but not necessarily complete – blue breast band.

The following subspecies are recognized:

 Aphelocoma californica immanis Grinnell, 1901 – Interior scrub jay
From Puget Sound through the Willamette Valley to Douglas County, Oregon
A large subspecies. Somewhat duller and lighter in color than californica due to gene flow from inland populations. Blue of head and neck less purplish than in woodhouseii group. Back usually quite brownish, underside and especially breast quite whitish, undertail coverts usually tinged pale blue or gray in males. Bill strong, wings and tail fairly short.

 Aphelocoma californica caurina Pitelka, 1951
Coastal SW Oregon from Rogue River valley south to Napa and Sonoma Counties; eastern limit the inner California Coast Ranges.
Similar to californica, but head and back more intensely colored, with bright purplish tinge to blue of head. Color similar to nominate, thus darker than immanis and most oocleptica. Relative to nominate californica, blue areas more purplish and brighter, breast darker than rest of underside.

 Aphelocoma californica oocleptica Swarth, 1918 – Nicasio scrub jay (includes A. c. superciliosa)
From Jackson, Klamath, and Lake Counties, Oregon, through Sacramento and San Joaquin Valleys and surrounding mountains to Kern County, San Francisco Bay area, and Alpine County. Eastwards to Inyo County and Virginia Mountains (Washoe County, Nevada), where it intergrades with nevadae of the woodhouseii group.
Quite variable according to the extent of gene flow between this taxon and nevadae. Generally similar to californica but larger; color of head and neck varies in lightness and amount of purplish hue. Back grayish; undertail coverts usually white. Bill usually heavy but variable according to habitat type (less heavy in birds of pinyon woodland).

 Aphelocoma californica californica (Vigors, 1839) – California scrub jay
California Coast Ranges from San Mateo County and SE Alameda County to SW Ventura County.
Blue of head usually strongly tinged purple. Back bluish-brownish gray, bluer towards the rump. Incomplete bluish-violet breast band. Underside greyish white, darker on the breast. Undertail coverts white tinged with blue. Thighs gray. Rectrices and remiges dark blue, the larger feathers duller. Bill heavy, tip strongly hooked.

 Aphelocoma californica obscura Anthony, 1889 – Belding's scrub jay
Coastal SW California, east to Little San Bernardino Mountains, some isolated mountain ranges in W Mojave Desert, and Whale Peak (San Diego County). Southwards through N Baja California, Mexico (Sierra de Juárez, Sierra San Pedro Mártir) to Todos Santos Bay
Smaller and darker than californica, with more intense purplish and brown coloration on head and back, respectively; prominent gray streaking on throat and distinct breast collar. Belly with smoky gray wash, lighter in the middle. Generally more intense coloration overall. Bill heavy.

 Aphelocoma californica cana Pitelka, 1951 – Eagle Mountain scrub jay
Only occurs in single-leaf pinyon woods on Eagle Mountain, Joshua Tree National Park.
Smaller, lighter and grayer than californica. Bill not as heavy. Apparently an isolate of hybrid origin between A. c. obscura and nevadae of the woodhouseii group.

References

Further reading
Madge, Steve; Burn, Hilary (1994): Crows and jays: a guide to the crows, jays and magpies of the world. A&C Black, London.

External links

 Western scrub jay Species Account – Cornell Lab of Ornithology
 It takes a thief to know a thief – University of Cambridge Comparative Psychology of Learning and Cognition Lab article on studies of the cognitive abilities of western scrub jays (Archived on the Wayback Machine)

California scrub jay
Native birds of the Western United States
Fauna of the California chaparral and woodlands
Fauna of the San Francisco Bay Area
Birds of Mexico
California scrub jay
California scrub jay
California scrub jay
California scrub jay